Rissoina pusilla is a species of minute sea snail, a marine gastropod mollusk or micromollusk in the family Rissoinidae.

Description
Only in fossil state.

Distribution
This species occurs in the Indian Ocean off Madagascar.

References

 Dautzenberg, Ph. (1923). Liste préliminaire des mollusques marins de Madagascar et description de deux espèces nouvelles. J. conchyliol. 68: 21-74

External links
 

Rissoinidae
Gastropods described in 1814